Anta Sambou is a Senegalese freestyle wrestler. She is a two-time medalist at the African Games. She won the gold medal in her event at the 2022 African Wrestling Championships held in El Jadida, Morocco.

Career 

She represented Senegal at the 2019 African Games and she won the silver medal in the women's freestyle 68 kg event. In 2020, she won the silver medal in the women's freestyle 68 kg event at the African Wrestling Championships held in Algiers, Algeria.

She competed at the 2021 African & Oceania Wrestling Olympic Qualification Tournament hoping to qualify for the 2020 Summer Olympics in Tokyo, Japan.

She competed in the 72 kg event at the 2021 Islamic Solidarity Games held in Konya, Turkey.

Major results

References

External links 
 

Living people
Year of birth missing (living people)
Place of birth missing (living people)
Senegalese female sport wrestlers
African Games silver medalists for Senegal
African Games bronze medalists for Senegal
African Games medalists in wrestling
Competitors at the 2015 African Games
Competitors at the 2019 African Games
African Wrestling Championships medalists
Islamic Solidarity Games competitors for Senegal
21st-century Senegalese women